The Call of Duty Championship 2017 was a Call of Duty: Infinite Warfare tournament on PlayStation 4 that occurred on August 9–13, 2017.

The tournament was won by OpTic Gaming with a team consisting of Seth "Scump" Abner, Matthew "FormaL" Piper, Ian "Crimsix" Porter and Damon "Karma" Barlow.

The tournament was livestreamed online on Twitch, YouTube and MLG.tv.

Format
Group Stage
Best of 5 Series
Top 2 advance to Knockout Stage
Bottom 2 teams are eliminated
Knockout Stage
Double Elimination
Best of 5 Series
Grand Finals
Team coming from the Losers Bracket must win two Best of 5 Series to claim victory.

Game Types and Maps
Included maps and modes:
Hardpoint: Breakout, Frost, Mayday, Precinct, Scorch, Throwback
Search and Destroy: Crusher, Frost, Mayday, Retaliation, Scorch, Throwback
Uplink: Frost, Mayday, Precinct, Throwback

Last Chance Qualifier
The last chance qualifier for this year's edition of the tournament was split up in to 3 regions North America, Europe and Asia-Pacific. Each region will hold an offline qualifier with 16 teams invited with invitations based on pro points standings and a varied amount of qualifying spots available. They are as follows:
North America - 8 Qualifying spots available
Europe - 6 Qualifying spots available
APAC - 2 Qualifying spots available

Last Chance Qualifier teams

^ Teams are listed by their pro points standings.

^ Flags represent the nationality of the majority of players on a team's active roster, not the country in which the organization is based.

Qualified teams

32 teams from the North America, Europe and APAC regions will qualify for the tournament. The 16 teams which qualified for Stage 2 of the 2017 CWL Pro League were the first teams to qualify. Another 16 teams will qualify via the last chance qualifier.

Pro League Teams
The 16 teams which qualified for Stage 2 of the 2017 CWL Pro League were the first teams to qualify for the 2018 Call of Duty Championship.

Last Chance Qualifier teams
16 further teams qualified from their respective regions last chance qualifiers.

Groups

Final standings

References

External links

2017 in Los Angeles
2017 in sports in California
2017 first-person shooter tournaments
Call of Duty Championship
Major League Gaming competitions